Conway Richard Dobbs (1795 – 28 February 1886) was an Irish politician.

Dobbs lived at Acton House in County Armagh, and served as a lieutenant in the Royal Navy.  He stood in Carrickfergus at the 1832 UK general election, and was elected as a Tory.  However, an election petition was raised, and he was unseated, and the seat remained unfilled until the next general election.

In 1841, Dobbs served as Sheriff of Antrim.  He was placed on the naval reserve list in 1851 and retired as a commander in 1864.

References

1795 births
1886 deaths
Members of the Parliament of the United Kingdom for County Antrim constituencies (1801–1922)
Royal Navy officers
Tory MPs (pre-1834)
UK MPs 1832–1835